Two ships of the British Royal Navy have been named HMS Birkenhead, after the English town of Birkenhead.

  was an iron-hulled troopship launched in 1845 and notably wrecked in 1852.
  was a  light cruiser launched in 1915, in action at Jutland, and sold 1921.

Royal Navy ship names